Dust is the third album by Berlin-based American electronic music artist Laurel Halo. It was released 
on June 23, 2017 by Hyperdub. The album features contributions from Eli Keszler, Julia Holter, Michael Salu, and Max D among others, and was preceded by the single "Jelly", featuring Klein and Lafawndah.

Critical reception

Upon its release, Dust was received positively by music critics, with a Metacritic weighed aggregate score of 84 out of 100 based on 18 reviews, indicating "universal acclaim". Writing for The Guardian, Ben Beaumont-Thomas called the album "a triumph of impressionism, where the digital and organic coexist in a radically beautiful whole," while naming it electronic." In his review for AllMusic, Paul Simpson described Dust as, "very disorienting and not always easy to grasp hold of, but it never comes close to sounding like anything else, and its best moments are highly compelling." Heather Phares described the album in the artist's biography as fusing jazz with avant-pop. Resident Advisor described the music on Dust as experimental. Andrew Dorsett of PopMatters said in his review that Halo is "crafting a series of drifting art pop pieces that evoke forgotten, buried materials long since fallen into disrepair.".  The Quietus' Joseph Burnett said that "her almost monomaniacal focus on the intricacies of sound since her earliest releases has clearly culminated with this record, one that is in constant flux between joyful abandon and grim introspection, pop-tinged electronica and avant-garde expressionism."

April Clare Welsh of Fact wrote: "Like Arca's Arca, Laurel Halo's third album also explores the human voice. But while Arca explores largely organic territory, Halo fashions a musique concrete mosaic of vocal cut-ups and robotic reveries."

Accolades

Track listing
Tracks adapted from Bandcamp.

Personnel
Credits adapted from the liner notes of Dust.

Musicians
 Laurel Halo – vocals, synthesizer, piano, vibraphone, guitaret
 Eli Keszler – drum kit, dumbek, glockenspiel
 Max D – cowbell 
 Klein – vocals 
 Lafawndah – vocals 
 Michael Salu – vocals 
 Craig Clouse – wurlitzer 
 Julia Holter – cello 
 Michael Beharie – electric guitar 
 Diamond Terrifier – tenor saxophone

Technical personnel
 Laurel Halo – production
 Cole M.G.N. – mixing
 Jason Goz – mastering

Artwork
 Phillip Aumann – photography

References

2017 albums
Experimental music albums
Laurel Halo albums
Art pop albums
Experimental music albums by American artists
Electronic albums by American artists
Musique concrète albums